Andrzej Morozowski (born 13 June 1957 in Warsaw) is a Polish journalist, television personality and writer, connected with Radio ZET and TVN 24.

Biography 

Andrzej Morozowski was born on 13 June 1957 in Warsaw into a Polish-Jewish family, as a son of the communist politician Mordechaj Mozes Morozowski. Morozowski was raised without any religion. After 1968 Polish political crisis his family stayed in Poland.

Morozowski graduated Theatre studies from the Aleksander Zelwerowicz State Theatre Academy in Warsaw. From 1990 to 2000 he worked for Radio ZET and Polish Television. Since 2001 Andrzej Morozowski has been working in the private television TVN 24, where he was presenting many auditions: Skaner polityczny (The Political Scanner), Bohater tygodnia (A hero of the Week), Studio 24, Kuluary (The Couloirs), Rozmowa bardzo polityczna (A very political conversation) and Prześwietlenie (The X-ray). In the years 2005-2010 Andrzej Morozowski and Tomasz Sekielski were presenting one of the most popular political shows in Polish television, Teraz my (Now we). Since 2010 he is leading his own show, Tak jest.

He is married with the Gazeta Wyborcza journalist, Agata Nowakowska. They have one son, Jan Morozowski.

Books 
 Teraz my prześwietlamy, Warsaw 2009
 Piękna dwudziestoletnia: 12 rozmów o wolnej Polsce, Warsaw 2009
 Koniec PiS-u: z Michałem Kamińskim rozmawia Andrzej Morozowski, Warsaw 2012

References 

1957 births
Living people
Polish television journalists
Polish radio journalists
Aleksander Zelwerowicz National Academy of Dramatic Art in Warsaw alumni
Polish people of Jewish descent